Tamás Borsos (born 13 September 1990) is a Hungarian handball player. He plays for Csurgói KK and the Hungarian national team.

He competed at the 2016 European Men's Handball Championship.

References

1990 births
Living people
Hungarian male handball players
People from Nagyatád
Sportspeople from Somogy County